Hubert Badanai (January 11, 1895 – September 19, 1986), born Umberto Badanai; was a Canadian automobile dealer and politician. He was the first Italian born member of Canadian Federal Parliament. 

Born in Azzano Decimo, Friuli-Venezia Giulia (north-eastern Italy), to a Jewish-Italian Father and Italian Mother. He moved to Canada when he was 18 and worked at a brickyard in Rosslyn. He later opened a successful car dealership and became an alderman in Fort William, Ontario for 9 years and mayor for 8 years. He was elected to the House of Commons of Canada for the riding of Fort William in the 1958 federal election. A Liberal, he was re-elected in 1962, 1963, 1965, and 1968. From 1963 to 1964, he was the Parliamentary Secretary to the Minister of Public Works. From 1964 to 1965, he was the Parliamentary Secretary to the Minister of Citizenship and Immigration.

References 
 
 F. Brent Scollie, Thunder Bay Mayors & Councillors 1873-1945 (Thunder Bay Historical Museum Society, 2000), 158–159.

External links 
 

1895 births
1986 deaths
Italian emigrants to Canada
Liberal Party of Canada MPs
Mayors of Fort William, Ontario
Members of the House of Commons of Canada from Ontario
People from the Province of Pordenone
Politicians from Thunder Bay